Take That Present: The Circus Live was the seventh concert tour by British pop group, Take That. The tour promoted their fifth studio album, The Circus. The tour began on 5 June 2009 at the Stadium of Light in Sunderland and finished on 5 July 2009 at Wembley Stadium in London. The Circus Live was their biggest tour to date. and was seen by 1,014,000 people, making a profit of £40,560,000. The tour became the fastest selling in UK history, with the 600,000 for all original eight dates selling out in five hours.

Opening acts
Gary Go (All)
James Morrison (5, 9, 16, 17, 20, 26 June, 1 July)
The Saturdays (6, 8, 19 June)
The Script (9, 10, 13, 21, 23, 28 June, 3 July)
Lady Gaga (4, 5 July)

Set list
 "The Adventures of a Lonely Balloon"
 "Greatest Day"
 "Hello"
 "Could It Be Magic"
 "Pray"
 "A Million Love Songs"
 "Back for Good"
 "The Garden"
 "Shine" 
 "Up All Night"
 "Wooden Boat"
 "How Did It Come to This?"
 The Circus Medley ("Love Ain't Here Anymore"/"Babe"/"Nobody Else"/"The Circus")
 "What Is Love"
 Clown Medley ("Do What U Like"/"Promises"/"It Only Takes a Minute"/"Take That & Party")
 "Said It All"
 "Never Forget"
 "Patience"
 "Relight My Fire" (featuring Loleatta Holloway)
Encore
"Hold Up a Light"
"Rule the World"

"Up All Night", "Wooden Boat" and "How Did It Come to This?" were performed by Take That as a rock band with Gary Barlow on keyboards, Howard Donald on drums, Mark Owen on a bass guitar and Jason Orange on an acoustic and electric guitar. Barlow also played piano in "Shine" and The Circus Medley where he sang part of "Babe", usually Owen's solo number.
Orange sang lead in "Wooden Boat" and "How Did It Come to This?", it was the only Take That's show where he had two solo songs. Donald sang lead in "What Is Love" and "Never Forget", Owen's lead was in "Hello", "Shine", "Up All Night" and "Hold Up a Light". In "The Garden" and "Never Forget" each band member had a solo line.

"The Garden" was sung by Take That on the back of a huge mechanical elephant carrying them from the B-stage to the main stage.
While singing "What Is Love", Take That members made themselves up as clowns on stage for the following Clown Medley which was a parody of their old boyband dance routines. During "It Only Takes a Minute" Donald, Orange and Owen rode unicycles (Orange said in the tour documentary it was Donald's idea) while Barlow rode a child's bike with stabilisers, making fun of his reputation as the clumsy member of the band. In "Relight My Fire" Take That played animal trainers with female dancers playing wild beasts.

Tour dates

DVD release
The Wembley Stadium concerts of 3 and 4 July 2009 were filmed and released as a two-disc DVD and Blu-ray set, released on 23 November 2009. A live album, containing several live recordings, and a bonus disc of Take That at Abbey Road, was released a week later. Highlights were broadcast on ITV1 on 19 December 2009. The DVD became the fastest selling DVD of all time in the UK, selling 82,414 copies in 24 hours, and 181,979 in its first week. It sold over 600,000 copies in September 2011 and has been certified 11× Platinum, becoming one of the best selling music DVDs ever in the UK.

Charts

Certifications

References

Take That concert tours
2009 concert tours